The women's shot put event at the 1976 Summer Olympics in Montreal, Quebec, Canada had an entry list of 13 competitors. The final was held on 31 July 1976. There was no qualification round.

Medalists

Abbreviations
All results shown are in metres

Records

Final

See also
 1974 Women's European Championships shot put (Rome)
 1978 Women's European Championships shot put (Prague)

References

 Results
 sports-reference

S
Shot put at the Olympics
1976 in women's athletics
Women's events at the 1976 Summer Olympics